Rhododendron pulchrum  (锦绣杜鹃), also identified as Rhododendron × pulchrum, is a rhododendron endemic to China. It grows as a semi-evergreen shrub,  in height, with leathery leaf blades, elliptic-oblong to elliptic-lanceolate or oblong-oblanceolate, 2–5(–7) × 1–2.5 cm in size. The flowers are rose-purple with dark red flecks. Hirsutum describes it as "a natural hybrid; seed × pollen= R. mucronatum var mucronatum × R. indicum var formosanum".

Synonyms
 Rhododendron indicum var. pulchrum (Sweet) G. Don
 Rhododendron indicum var. smithii Sweet
 Rhododendron phoeniceum f. smithii (Sweet) E.H. Wilson

References
 Brit. Fl. Gard. ser. 2, 2: t. 117. 1831.

pulchrum